Pine Stump Junction is an unincorporated community in Luce County in the U.S. state of Michigan. The community is located within McMillan Township. As an unincorporated community, Pine Stump Junction has no legally defined boundaries or population statistics of its own.

Description
The community is centered along County Road 407 about halfway between Deer Park to the north and the village of Newberry to the south.

The junction was marked by a huge pine stump with a big iron mailbox attached. Mail was brought from Newberry and left in the box to be picked up by someone from the camps along the Grand Marais-Paradise road. The place was named on county maps as early as the 1860s.

References

Unincorporated communities in Luce County, Michigan
Unincorporated communities in Michigan